Butterwick may refer to he following places:

England 
Butterwick, Cumbria
Butterwick, Dorset
Butterwick, County Durham
Butterwick, Lincolnshire
East Butterwick, Isle of Axholme, North Lincolnshire
West Butterwick, Isle of Axholme, North Lincolnshire
Butterwick, Barton-le-Street, North Yorkshire
Butterwick, Foxholes, North Yorkshire

Other uses 
 Butterwick, New South Wales, in Port Stephens Council, Australia